Kfar Haruv (lit. Carob Village) is an Israeli settlement organized as a kibbutz located in the southern Golan Heights. A member of the Kibbutz Movement, it falls under the jurisdiction of Golan Regional Council. The international community considers Israeli settlements in the Golan Heights illegal under international law, but the Israeli government disputes this.

Geography

History

Antiquity
A village called Kfar Yahrib is mentioned in the 3rd century Mosaic of Rehob.

Ottoman era
Later an Arab village, Kafr Harib, existed at the south edge of the current settlement's built-up area. Kafr Harib appeared in Ottoman tax registers in 1596 as a village in the Nahiya of Jawlan Garbi in the Qada of Hawran. It had a population of 5 Muslim households and 7 bachelors and paid taxes on wheat, barley and goats or beehives. In 1888, Gottlieb Schumacher described it as a village of 70 stone and mud huts with about 200 "affable and hospitable" inhabitants, who ran an excellent bee industry in addition to cultivation.

British Mandate
Later the village lay just outside the borders of Mandatory Palestine, though some of its lands lay inside Palestine. Kafr Harib village had about 1900 inhabitants when it was depopulated during the Six Day War in 1967.

Modern era
The Israeli settlement was founded in 1973, and took its name from Kafr Harib. The new Israeli founders settled temporarily in Afik camp, and moved to the present-day location (the site of a Syrian army base that overlooks Ein Gev and HaOn) in 1974. The sixteenth Israeli settlement established in the Golan Heights, its members are native Israelis and immigrants from the United States. In 2011, there were 400 residents, 90 of them living in a neighborhood built in 2004.

Economy
The main economic branch is A.R.I. Kfar Haruv which manufactures hydraulic equipment. Other sources of income are orchards, cows, traditional crops, and tourist lodging.Kfar Haruv also has a laundromat and a drapery workshop. It is a co-operator of Hamat Gader, and operates Mitzpe LeShalom (Peace Vista), a tourist attraction on the edge of the cliffs.

See also
 Israeli-occupied territories
 Status of territories occupied by Israel in 1967
 Israeli Military Governorate

References

External links
Kfar Haruv Golan Heights website 

Israeli settlements in the Golan Heights
Kibbutzim
Kibbutz Movement
Golan Regional Council
Populated places established in 1974
Populated places in Northern District (Israel)
1974 establishments in the Israeli Military Governorate